The 1990 CFL season is considered to be the 37th season in modern-day Canadian football, although it is officially the 33rd Canadian Football League season.

CFL News in 1990
J. Donald Crump was appointed as the eighth CFL Commissioner on Friday, January 5.

The CFL Annual Meetings-Canadian College Draft was held in Hamilton for the third straight year.

The CFL increased roster limit to 37 players to include 20 non-imports, 14 imports and 3 quarterbacks with the reserve list remaining at two players.

The Toronto Argonauts and the BC Lions set a record for most points in a game when they scored 111 points on Saturday, September 1 at the SkyDome. The Argonauts won the game 68–43.

The BC Lions added silver to its team colour scheme. In addition, Vancouver played host to the Grey Cup game for the 11th time, and for the fourth time at BC Place.

Citing multi-million dollar losses, the league-run Canadian Football Network syndication service ceased operations after this season; it had replaced CTV's CFL coverage in 1987.

Regular season standings

Final regular season standings
Note: GP = Games Played, W = Wins, L = Losses, T = Ties, PF = Points For, PA = Points Against, Pts = Points

Bold text means that they have clinched the playoffs.
Calgary and Winnipeg have first round byes.

Grey Cup playoffs

The Winnipeg Blue Bombers are the 1990 Grey Cup champions, humiliating the Edmonton Eskimos 50–11, at Vancouver's BC Place Stadium.  The Blue Bombers' Tom Burgess (QB) was named the Grey Cup's Most Valuable Player on Offence and Greg Battle (LB) was named Grey Cup's Most Valuable Player on Defence, while Warren Hudson (FB) was named the Grey Cup's Most Valuable Canadian.

Playoff bracket

CFL Leaders
 CFL Passing Leaders
 CFL Rushing Leaders
 CFL Receiving Leaders

1990 CFL All-Stars

Offence
QB – Kent Austin, Saskatchewan Roughriders
FB – Blake Marshall, Edmonton Eskimos
RB – Robert Mimbs, Winnipeg Blue Bombers
SB – Darrell Smith, Toronto Argonauts
SB – Craig Ellis, Edmonton Eskimos
WR – Stephen Jones, Ottawa Rough Riders
WR – Don Narcisse, Saskatchewan Roughriders
C – Rod Connop, Edmonton Eskimos
OG – Dan Ferrone, Toronto Argonauts
OG – Roger Aldag, Saskatchewan Roughriders
OT – Jim Mills, BC Lions
OT – Chris Walby, Winnipeg Blue Bombers

Defence
DT – Kent Warnock, Calgary Stampeders
DT – Harold Hallman, Toronto Argonauts
DE – Stewart Hill, Edmonton Eskimos
DE – Greg Stumon, Ottawa Rough Riders
LB – Danny Bass, Edmonton Eskimos
LB – Willie Pless, BC Lions
LB – Greg Battle, Winnipeg Blue Bombers
CB – Less Browne, Winnipeg Blue Bombers
CB – Rod Hill, Winnipeg Blue Bombers
DB – Troy Wilson, Ottawa Rough Riders
DB – Don Wilson, Toronto Argonauts
DS – Greg Peterson, Calgary Stampeders

Special teams
P – Bob Cameron, Winnipeg Blue Bombers
K – Dave Ridgway, Saskatchewan Roughriders
ST – Mike "Pinball" Clemons, Toronto Argonauts

1990 Eastern All-Stars

Offence
QB – Tom Burgess, Winnipeg Blue Bombers
FB – Warren Hudson, Winnipeg Blue Bombers
RB – Robert Mimbs, Winnipeg Blue Bombers
SB – Darrell Smith, Toronto Argonauts
SB – Rick House, Winnipeg Blue Bombers
WR – Stephen Jones, Ottawa Rough Riders
WR – Earl Winfield, Hamilton Tiger-Cats
C – Lyle Bauer, Winnipeg Blue Bombers
OG – Dan Ferrone, Toronto Argonauts
OG – Gerald Roper, Ottawa Rough Riders
OT – Rob Smith, Ottawa Rough Riders
OT – Chris Walby, Winnipeg Blue Bombers

Defence
DT – Lloyd Lewis, Ottawa Rough Riders
DT – Harold Hallman, Toronto Argonauts
DE – Grover Covington, Hamilton Tiger-Cats
DE – Greg Stumon, Ottawa Rough Riders
LB – Tyrone Jones, Winnipeg Blue Bombers
LB – Bruce Holmes, Ottawa Rough Riders
LB – Greg Battle, Winnipeg Blue Bombers
CB – Less Browne, Winnipeg Blue Bombers
CB – Rod Hill, Winnipeg Blue Bombers
DB – Troy Wilson, Ottawa Rough Riders
DB – Don Wilson, Toronto Argonauts
S  – Scott Flagel, Ottawa Rough Riders

Special teams
P – Bob Cameron, Winnipeg Blue Bombers
K – Paul Osbaldiston, Hamilton Tiger-Cats
ST – Mike "Pinball" Clemons, Toronto Argonauts

1990 Western All-Stars

Offence
QB – Kent Austin, Saskatchewan Roughriders
FB – Blake Marshall, Edmonton Eskimos
RB – Reggie Taylor, Edmonton Eskimos
SB – Ray Elgaard, Saskatchewan Roughriders
SB – Craig Ellis, Edmonton Eskimos
WR – Ray Alexander, BC Lions
WR – Don Narcisse, Saskatchewan Roughriders
C – Rod Connop, Edmonton Eskimos
OG – Leo Blanchard, Calgary Stampeders
OG – Roger Aldag, Saskatchewan Roughriders
OT – Jim Mills, BC Lions
OT – Lloyd Fairbanks, Calgary Stampeders

Defence
DT – Kent Warnock, Calgary Stampeders
DT – Brett Williams, Edmonton Eskimos
DE – Stewart Hill, Edmonton Eskimos
DE – Will Johnson, Calgary Stampeders
LB – Danny Bass, Edmonton Eskimos
LB – Willie Pless, BC Lions
LB – Dan Rashovich, Saskatchewan Roughriders
CB – Andre Francis, Edmonton Eskimos
CB – Keith Gooch, Edmonton Eskimos
DB – Richie Hall, Saskatchewan Roughriders
DB – David McCrary, Calgary Stampeders
DS – Greg Peterson, Calgary Stampeders

Special teams
P – Brent Matich, Calgary Stampeders
K – Dave Ridgway, Saskatchewan Roughriders
ST – Derrick Crawford, Calgary Stampeders

1990 CFL Awards
CFL's Most Outstanding Player Award – Mike "Pinball" Clemons (RB), Toronto Argonauts
CFL's Most Outstanding Canadian Award – Ray Elgaard (SB), Saskatchewan Roughriders
CFL's Most Outstanding Defensive Player Award – Greg Battle (LB), Winnipeg Blue Bombers
CFL's Most Outstanding Offensive Lineman Award – Jim Mills (OT), BC Lions
CFL's Most Outstanding Rookie Award – Reggie Barnes (RB), Ottawa Rough Riders
CFLPA's Outstanding Community Service Award – Richie Hall (DB), Saskatchewan Roughriders
CFL's Coach of the Year – Mike Riley, Winnipeg Blue Bombers
Commissioner's Award - Gregory B. Fulton, Toronto

References 

CFL
Canadian Football League seasons